The  is an electric multiple unit (EMU) commuter train type operated by the private railway operator Keihan Electric Railway in Kyoto, Japan, since 1995.

Design
The 7200 series trains were developed from the earlier 7000 series trains introduced in 1989.

Interior
Passenger accommodation consists of longitudinal bench seating throughout.

Formations

8-car trainsets
The eight-car trains (original 7201 and 7202) are formed as follows, with four motored ("M") cars and four non-powered trailer ("T") cars.

 "Mc" cars are motored driving cars (with driving cabs).
 "M" cars are motored intermediate cars.
 "T" cars are unpowered trailer cars.
 The Mc and M cars each have one scissors-type pantograph.
 The 7700 cars are designated as "mildly air-conditioned" cars.

7-car trainsets

The seven-car trains (7201 and 7203) are formed as follows, with three motored ("M") cars and four non-powered trailer ("T") cars.

 "Mc" cars are motored driving cars (with driving cabs).
 "M" cars are motored intermediate cars.
 "T" cars are unpowered trailer cars.
 The Mc and M cars each have one scissors-type pantograph.
 The 7700 cars are designated as "mildly air-conditioned" cars.

History
The first trains were delivered in 1994, entering revenue service in 1995. From 2008, the fleet was repainted into the new Keihan commuter train livery of dark green and white, with the entire fleet treated by 2011.

In February 2015, set 7201 was reformed as a seven-car set. Car 7301 removed when the set was reduced to seven cars was renumbered 10101 and inserted into 10000 series EMU set 10001 in February 2016 when that set was lengthened from four to seven cars.

References

External links

  

Electric multiple units of Japan
7200 series
Train-related introductions in 1995
Kawasaki multiple units
1500 V DC multiple units of Japan